Norman David Emerson (10 July 1900 – 12 January 1966) was an Anglican priest and author.

Emerson was born in Lurgan
and educated at Trinity College, Dublin. He was ordained in 1924 and being a curate at Drumcondra and Rathgar he was the rector of St Mary’s Dublin from 1933 to 1961 when he became Dean of Christ Church Cathedral, Dublin, a position he held until his death.

Notes

1900 births
1966 deaths
People from Lurgan
Alumni of Trinity College Dublin
Deans of Christ Church Cathedral, Dublin
Place of death missing
20th-century Irish Anglican priests